AICPA Statements of Position (SOPs), available full-text at the links below from the University of Mississippi's Library Digital Collections with the permission of the American Institute of Certified Public Accountants (AICPA), have been issued by the AICPA's Accounting Standards Division since 1974 and are meant to influence the development of accounting standards and to propose revisions to the AICPA's Audit and Accounting Guide (AAGs) series.

Those SOPs dealing with accounting standards are superseded by the FASB's Accounting Standards Codification.

Audit and Attest SOPs were issued to revise or supplement the AICPA's Audit and Accounting Guides, provide implementation guidance for specific types of audit and attest engagements, and guidance in specialized areas of audit and attest.  These SOPs have the same authority as the AAGs.

The full-text in the list below links to reproductions of SOPs as originally issued.  Revisions, deletions, and status changes are recorded in the annual AICPA publication Technical Practice Aids which began in 1977.

List of Statements of Position

Notes

External links
 American Institute of Certified Public Accountants
 Accounting Standards Guide

United States Generally Accepted Accounting Principles
Accounting in the United States